Brady Hunter House (born June 4, 2003) is an American professional baseball Third baseman in the Washington Nationals organization.

Amateur career
House grew up in Winder, Georgia. While attending middle school, he was named to Baseball USA's U-12 National Team. House attended Winder-Barrow High School. He hit .445 with five home runs and 21 RBIs as a sophomore in 2019. Following the season, he committed to play college baseball at the University of Tennessee. House batted .653 as a junior through 15 games before his season was cut short due to the coronavirus pandemic. House entered his senior year in 2021 as a top prospect for the upcoming Major League Baseball draft. He finished his senior season with a .549 batting average and 52 runs scored, 20 RBIs, and eight home runs, and was ranked the best power hitting prospect by MLB.com.

Professional career
House was selected by the Washington Nationals with the 11th overall selection of the 2021 Major League Baseball draft. He signed with the team on July 31, 2021, and received a $5 million signing bonus. House was assigned to the Rookie-level Florida Complex League Nationals to start his professional career. Over 16 games, he batted .322 with four home runs and 12 RBIs.

References

External links

USA Baseball profile

2003 births
Baseball players from Georgia (U.S. state)
Baseball shortstops
Florida Complex League Nationals players
Living people
Fredericksburg Nationals players
People from Winder, Georgia